Pelesa may refer to:

 The name of a part of the Ūla river